Saragossa was a plantation in Natchez, Adams County, Mississippi.

Location
It is located on Saragossa Road in Natchez, Mississippi.

History
The plantation was established in 1823 by Dr Stephen Duncan (1787-1867), the wealthiest cotton planter and the second largest slaveowner in the Antebellum South. Cotton was the main cash crop grown here.

In 1835, William St. John Elliot purchased the plantation, who also owned D'Evereux. In 1849, it was purchased by William G. Conner, who sold it back to Elliot in 1852. That same year, in 1852, it was purchased by Winfield Gibson. Three years later, in 1855, it was purchased by Caroline Williams, who bequeathed it to her daughter, Anna (Williams) Smith, and her son-in-law, Walton Pembroke Smith. It then stayed in the Smith family until the 1970s.

It has been listed on the National Register of Historic Places since November 24, 1980.

References

External links

Houses on the National Register of Historic Places in Mississippi
Houses in Natchez, Mississippi
National Register of Historic Places in Natchez, Mississippi
Plantations in Mississippi